Kenneth P. Ekman is a United States Air Force major general who serves as the director of strategy, engagement and programs of the United States Africa Command, replacing Major General John M. Wood. He most recently served as deputy commander for operations of the Combined Joint Task Force – Operation Inherent Resolve. Previously, he was the vice commander of the First Air Force.

References

 

Living people
Place of birth missing (living people)
Recipients of the Defense Superior Service Medal
Recipients of the Distinguished Flying Cross (United States)
Recipients of the Legion of Merit
United States Air Force generals
United States Air Force personnel of the Iraq War
United States Air Force personnel of the War in Afghanistan (2001–2021)
Year of birth missing (living people)